Primate of Canada may refer to:
 Primate of the Anglican Church of Canada
 Roman Catholic Primate of Canada
 Primate of the Ukrainian Orthodox Church of Canada